Glorietta is a shopping mall complex in the Ayala Center, Makati, Metro Manila, Philippines. The mall is owned by Ayala Land and operated through its subsidiary, the Ayala Malls. The mall is divided into five sections (named Glorietta 1–5) and contains many shops and restaurants, as well as cinemas, a gym, arcades and a large central activity center, often used to stage events.

Glorietta 1-4 is integrated with the nearby Greenbelt, SM Makati, Rustan's Makati and The Landmark. Glorietta 5 is fully detached, located in front of the lot formerly occupied by an open parking area between Hotel InterContinental Manila and Rustan's Makati. Coinciding with the redevelopment, the tenants affected by the October 19, 2007 explosion were given an option to relocate there.

History

Origin at the Makati Commercial Center
Glorietta was originally a park centrally located in the Makati Commercial Center complex. The Glorietta park, with its outdoor stage for event hosting, was built in the 1970s. It was landscaped by Ildefonso P. Santos Jr., a National Artist for Architecture who was also credited for designing the entire complex. The Makati Commercial Center complex, inauguatred in the 1960s, consisted of several small arcades (Maranaw Arcade, Makati Arcade, Angela Arcade, Lising's Commercial, Mayfair Center, Bricktown), theaters (Rizal Theater and Quad Cinemas) and freestanding retail outlets (including Makati Supermart, Sulo Restaurant, Rustan's, Shoe Mart and Mercury Drug).

In 1990, Ayala decided to redevelop Makati Commercial Center, then branded The Center Makati, into a new development named the Ayala Center. The plan called for the redevelopment of the Glorietta park and the surrounding shopping arcades into a single shopping mall. To mark the change, the MCC was renamed as the Ayala Center in 1991.

As Glorietta

The mall was divided into four sections:
 Quad 1 - which retained the original four Quad cinemas until 2009;
 Quad 2 - which had an indoor theme park named Glico's Great Adventure, a shopping arcade named Goldcrest, and was soon to become the main setting for a deadly explosion in 2007;
 Quad 3 - which would soon be the home of international restaurants like Hard Rock Cafe and TGI Friday's; 
 Glorietta 4 - a new hub for entertainment with a Timezone branch and seven additional cinemas, and also the home of Oakwood Premier (later, Ascott Makati), a premier hotel that stood on top of the mall and became the setting for the Oakwood mutiny, an infamous political siege led by the Magdalo Group which occurred in 2003.

All four components were home to a variety of shops and restaurants. While Quad 1 and 2 opened in 1991, Glorietta 3 opened in 1992 and Glorietta 4 opened in 1998, just six years later, as a result of the construction of Oakwood Premier. With the opening of Glorietta 4, Quads 1, 2 and 3 would be renamed Glorietta 1, 2 and 3, respectively.

Tenants that set up shop in Ayala Center prior to Glorietta's development, most notably Mercury Drug, Automatic Center, Jollibee, Max's, and McDonald's, also found a home in Glorietta. The department stores surrounding the mall – SM Makati, The Landmark, and Rustan's – were utilized by Glorietta as its anchor tenants for its supermarkets and department stores.

By the mid- and late 1990s, Glorietta gained popularity as a premier mall. It has an air-conditioned atrium with water features, an indoor children's playground, and an activity center that hosts concerts and shows.

The mall was known as Quad until 1997, when it adopted Glorietta as its present name, though the Glorietta name was used as a secondary branding since 1992. Glorietta is a Spanish word used to describe the public meeting place in Spanish colonial-era designed towns throughout the Philippines.

Other new buildings were also constructed between 1999 and 2005, making Glorietta larger than its original construction plan. Glorietta 5, an additional wing detached from Glorietta 1 to 4, was opened in 2009. Later in 2010, Glorietta 1 and 2 underwent reconstruction and redevelopment with new buildings; they were reopened on November 5 and December 7 in 2012, respectively. On November 29, 2012, Move to the Vibe of Glorietta, a fashion show, was held at the mall's new Palm Drive Activity Center and broke the Guinness World Record for the “Most People Modeling on a Catwalk” with 2,255 participants, beating Istanbul's 1,967.

The flagship Uniqlo store opened on October 5, 2018 in Glorietta 5, occupying the ground and second levels of the mall; it is Uniqlo's largest store in Southeast Asia. A year later, a new roofdeck named "Top of the Glo" was opened, located on the roofdeck of Glorietta 1 and 2. Under Mitsubishi's partnership, a Japan-inspired retail area opened in June 2019 at the roof deck with HalloHallo as its anchor. The roofdeck is connected to the 4th level of Holiday Inn and Suites Makati, with access to Glorietta 4 Cinemas at the same level. The Glorietta 2 section of the roofdeck, which is dubbed "Japan Town," opened in June 2019.

In 2019, a remodeled Food Choices area in Glorietta 4 was opened. The section opened with more food shops, and the area was extended into the location formerly occupied by Automatic Centre and BLIMS Fine Furniture. Consequently, both these stores were moved to the former location of National Book Store's third floor location in Glorietta 1 as part of the remodeling project. BLIMS re-opened at its new location in April, while Automatic Centre opened their relocated store in June. The main atrium at the center of the mall was closed for a major renovation in early 2019 and reopened on November in the same year.

Incidents and accidents

2000 bombing
On May 17, 2000, thirteen (13) people were injured in an explosion at Glorietta 2. Police said the blast (by a homemade explosive) originated from a restroom of a restaurant and affected Timezone, a nearby game arcade center, as well as the ceiling of the bridge connecting Glorietta 2 to the then Park Square 2. Two rival gangs were seen fighting near the restaurant shortly before the blast occurred.

Oakwood mutiny (July 27, 2003)

Magdalo soldiers led by Lt. Sr. Grade Antonio Trillanes IV took control of the Oakwood apartments in Makati. Glorietta, where the Oakwood Premier stood, was also closed during the siege.

2005 Valentine's Day bombings

A passenger bus was bombed in Makati, near Glorietta. Four people were killed and 36 injured. On the same day, a mall in General Santos was also bombed. Abu Sayyaf claimed responsibility, with spokesperson Abu Solaiman saying on a radio interview: "This is our Valentine gift to Gloria".

2007 explosion (October 19, 2007)

An explosion in Glorietta 2 killed eleven people and injured a hundred others. Initially, authorities termed it a liquefied petroleum gas explosion in a restaurant, but later began investigating the possibility that the explosion may have been a C-4 bomb.  The explosion destroyed much of Glorietta 2's main lobby and vehicles parked outside. Several days later, October 23, 2007, senior government officials expressed "a high level of certainty" that the explosion was an accident, but the bomb theory has not been totally ruled out. This was brought on by the inability of experts to find bomb components after four days of rigorous investigation. It is believed that the explosion was caused by underground structures in the mall that might have triggered the blast, pending further investigation.

Fire incidents
October 21, 2007: A fire broke out at noon in the kitchen of one of the restaurants in Glorietta 4, not affected by the 2007 Glorietta blast two days earlier. It was put out by firemen an hour later.
 November 20, 2016: At around 8 in the evening, a fire struck a restaurant in Glorietta 3 right above the Gold's Gym branch, without injuries or casualties.
 April 10, 2017: A minor fire broke out at the Glorietta 2 roof deck past 6 in the evening. A fire out was declared less than 25 minutes later. There were no reported injuries.
 May 19, 2019: A minor fire incident occurred at a milk tea shop being renovated at Glorietta 2 at between 5:59pm and 6:20pm. Bureau of Fire Protection declared a fire out at 6:31pm. The incident left one injured.

Gallery

See also
Ayala Center
List of largest shopping malls
List of largest shopping malls in the Philippines
List of shopping malls in Metro Manila

Notes

References

External links
Glorietta Official Website

Shopping malls in Makati
Buildings and structures in Makati
Makati Central Business District
Ayala Malls
Shopping malls established in 1991